Oudsbergen is a municipality in the Belgian province of Limburg that arose on 1 January 2019 from the merging of the municipalities of Opglabbeek and Meeuwen-Gruitrode.

The merged municipality has an area of 116.24 km2 and a population of 23,520 people in 2021.

Creation

The Flemish Government provides incentives for municipalities to voluntarily merge. The municipal councils of Opglabbeek and Meeuwen-Gruitrode approved a merge in principle in November 2016. Definitive approval occurred on 26 June 2017, which was ratified by Flemish decree of 4 May 2018 alongside several other merges, all to be effective per 1 January 2019.

As of 1 January 2018, the municipality of Opglabbeek had a population of 10,332 and Meeuwen-Gruitrode a population of 13,091.

Government
The first elections for the new municipality were held during the regular local elections of 14 October 2018, electing a municipal council for the legislative period of 2019–2024. CD&V obtained a majority of seats in the municipal council (17 out of 27). Lode Ceyssens, who was mayor of Meeuwen-Gruitrode until then, became mayor of Oudsbergen.

References

External links
 Official site (in Dutch)

 
Municipalities of Limburg (Belgium)
Populated places in Limburg (Belgium)